Gotham City, or simply Gotham, is a fictional city appearing in American comic books published by DC Comics, best known as the home of the superhero Batman and his allies and foes. Created by writer Bill Finger and artist Bob Kane, the city was first identified as Batman's place of residence in Batman #4 (December 1940) and has since been the primary setting for stories featuring the character.

Gotham City is traditionally depicted as being located in the U.S. state of New Jersey. Gotham's look and atmosphere was primarily influenced by New York City. Architect Hugh Ferriss’ designs also influenced the look and emotional feel of Gotham City, particularly in its later depictions. Finger chose the name "Gotham" so that the residents of any city could identify with it.

Locations used as inspiration or filming locations for Gotham City in the live-action Batman films and television series have included Chicago, Pittsburgh, Los Angeles, New York City, Newark, London, Glasgow, Hong Kong, and Liverpool.

Origin of name
Writer Bill Finger, on the naming of the city, said, "Originally I was going to call Gotham City 'Civic City.' Then I tried 'Capital City,' then 'Coast City.' Then I flipped through the New York City phone book and spotted the name 'Gotham Jewelers' and said, 'That's it,' Gotham City. We didn't call it New York because we wanted anybody in any city to identify with it."

"Gotham" has been a nickname for New York City that first became popular in the nineteenth century; Washington Irving had first attached it to New York in the November 11, 1807, edition of his Salmagundi, a periodical which lampooned New York culture and politics. Irving took the name from the village of Gotham, Nottinghamshire, England: a place inhabited, according to folklore, by fools.

Geography

Location in New Jersey

Gotham City, like other cities in the DC Universe, has varied in its portrayals over the decades, but the city's location is traditionally depicted as being in the state of New Jersey. In Amazing World of DC Comics #14 (March 1977), writer Mark Gruenwald discusses the history of the Justice League and indicates that Gotham City is located in New Jersey.

In The World's Greatest Super Heroes (August 13, 1978) comic strip, a map is shown placing Gotham City in New Jersey and Metropolis in Delaware. World's Finest Comics #259 (November 1979) also confirms that Gotham is in New Jersey. The New Adventures of Superboy #22 (October 1981) and the 1990 Atlas of the DC Universe both show maps of Gotham City in New Jersey and Metropolis in the state of Delaware.

Detective Comics #503 (June 1983) includes several references suggesting Gotham City is in New Jersey. A location on the Jersey Shore is described as "twenty miles north of Gotham". Within the same issue, Robin and Batgirl drive from a "secret New Jersey airfield" to Gotham City and then drive on the "Hudson County Highway", a reference to the real-life Hudson County in New Jersey.

Batman: Shadow of the Bat Annual #1 (June 1993) further establishes that Gotham City is in New Jersey. Sal E. Jordan's driver's license in the comic shows his address as "72 Faxcol Dr Gotham City, NJ 12345", although the ZIP Code is actually in Schenectady, New York.

The 2016 film Suicide Squad reveals Gotham City to be in the state of New Jersey within the DC Extended Universe.

In relation to Metropolis

Gotham City is the home of Batman, just as Metropolis is home to Superman, and the two heroes often work together in both cities. In comic book depictions, the exact distance between Gotham and Metropolis has varied over the years, with the cities usually being within driving distance of each other. The two cities are sometimes portrayed as twin cities on opposite sides of the Delaware Bay, with Gotham in New Jersey and Metropolis in Delaware. The Atlas of the DC Universe from the 1990s places Metropolis in Delaware and Gotham City in New Jersey.

New York has also garnered the nickname Metropolis to describe the city in the daytime in popular culture, contrasting with Gotham, sometimes used to describe New York City at night. During the Bronze Age of Comic Books, the Metro-Narrows Bridge was depicted as the main route connecting the twin cities of Metropolis and Gotham City. It has been described as being the longest suspension bridge in the world.

A map appeared in The New Adventures of Superboy #22 (October 1981), that showed Smallville within driving distance of both Metropolis and Gotham City; Smallville was relocated to Kansas in post-Crisis continuity. A map of the United States in The Secret Files & Origins Guide to the DC Universe 2000 #1 (March 2000) depicts Metropolis and Gotham City as being somewhere in the Tri-state Area alongside Blüdhaven.

Within the DC Extended Universe, the 2016 film Batman v Superman: Dawn of Justice depicts Gotham City as being located across a bay from Metropolis.

History
A Norwegian mercenary, Captain Jon Logerquist, founded Gotham City in 1635 and the British later took it over—a story that parallels the founding of New York by the Dutch (as New Amsterdam) and later takeover by the British.  During the American Revolutionary War, Gotham City was the site of a major battle (paralleling the real-life Battle of Brooklyn). This was detailed in Rick Veitch's Swamp Thing #85 featuring Tomahawk. Rumors held it to be the site of various occult rites.

The 2011 comic book series Batman: Gates of Gotham details a history of Gotham City in which Alan Wayne (Bruce Wayne's ancestor), Theodore Cobblepot (Oswald Cobblepot's ancestor), and Edward Elliot (Thomas Elliot's ancestor), are considered the founding fathers of Gotham. In 1881, they constructed three bridges called the Gates of Gotham, each bearing one of their last names.  Edward Elliot became increasingly jealous of the Wayne family's popularity and wealth during this period, jealousy that would spread to his great-great-grandson, Thomas Elliot or Hush.

The occult origins of Gotham are further delved into by Peter Milligan's 1990 story arc "Dark Knight, Dark City", which reveals that some of the American Founding Fathers are involved in summoning a bat-demon which becomes trapped beneath old "Gotham Town", its dark influence spreading as Gotham City evolves. A similar trend is followed in 2005's Shadowpact #5 by Bill Willingham, which expands upon Gotham's occult heritage by revealing a being who has slept for 40,000 years beneath the land upon which Gotham City was built. Strega, the being's servant, says that the "dark and often cursed character" of the city was influenced by the being who now uses the name "Doctor Gotham."

In Gotham Underground #2 by Frank Tieri, Tobias Whale claims that 19th century Gotham was run by five rival gangs, until the first "masks" appeared, eventually forming a gang of their own. It is not clear whether these were vigilantes or costumed criminals.

Many storylines have added more events to Gotham's history, at the same time greatly affecting the city and its people. Perhaps the greatest in effect was a long set of serial storylines, which started with Ra's al Ghul releasing a debilitating virus called the "Clench" during the "Contagion" storyline. As that arc concluded, the city was beginning to recover, only to suffer an earthquake measuring 7.6 on the Richter Scale in the 1998 "Cataclysm" storyline. This resulted in the federal government cutting Gotham off from the rest of the United States in the 1999 storyline "No Man's Land", the city's remaining residents forced to engage in gang warfare, either as active participants or paying for protection from groups ranging from the GCPD to the Penguin, just to stay alive. Eventually, Gotham was rebuilt and returned to the U.S. as part of a campaign mounted by Lex Luthor, who used the positive publicity of his role to make a successful bid for the position of President of the United States.

Suggestions of other Gotham City histories include a founding date of 1820 seen in a city seal in Batman: Return of the Caped Crusaders.

Culture
Batman writer and editor Dennis O'Neil has said that, figuratively, Batman's Gotham City is akin to "Manhattan below 14th Street at eleven minutes past midnight on the coldest night in November". Batman artist Neal Adams has long believed that Chicago has been the basis for Gotham, stating "one of the things about Chicago is Chicago has alleys (which are virtually nonexistent in New York). Back alleys, that's where Batman fights all the bad guys." The statement "Metropolis is New York by day; Gotham City is New York by night" has been variously attributed to comics creators Frank Miller and John Byrne.

In designing Batman: The Animated Series, creators Bruce Timm and Eric Radomski emulated the Tim Burton films' "otherworldly timelessness," incorporating period features such as black-and-white title cards, police airships (although no such thing existed, Timm has stated that he found it to fit the show's style), and a "vintage" color scheme with film noir flourishes. Police airships have since been incorporated into Batman comic books and are a recurring element in Gotham City.

Concerning the evolution of Gotham throughout the years, former Batman editor Paul Levitz has stated, "Each guy adds their own vision. That's the fun of comics, rebuilding a city each time".

Architecture

In Batman: Gothic, Gotham Cathedral plays a central role for the story, as it is built by Mr Whisper, the story's antagonist.

In a 1992 storyline, a man obsessed with Pinkney's architecture blew up several Gotham buildings in order to reveal the Pinkney structures they had hidden; the editorial purpose behind this was to transform the city depicted in the comics to resemble the designs created by Anton Furst for the 1989 Batman film.

Batman Begins features a CGI-augmented version of Chicago while The Dark Knight more directly features Chicago infrastructure and architecture such as Navy Pier. However, The Dark Knight Rises abandoned Chicago, instead shooting in Pittsburgh, Los Angeles, New York City, Newark, New Jersey, London and Glasgow.

Notable residents
Over the years, in various Batman-related titles in the chronological DC Comics continuity, the Caped Crusader enlists the help of numerous characters, the first being his trusty sidekick, Robin. Although a singular title, many have donned the mantle of the Boy Wonder over the years. The first being Nightwing, then came Red Hood, Red Robin, and finally Batman's son Damian Wayne. In addition to the Robins or former Robins, there is also Catwoman, Batgirl, and Huntress.

Other DC characters have also been depicted to be living in Gotham, such as mercenary Tommy Monaghan and renowned demonologist Jason Blood.
Within modern DC Universe continuity, Batman is not the first hero in Gotham. Stories featuring Alan Scott, the Golden Age Green Lantern, set before and during World War II depict Scott living in Gotham, and later depictions show him running his Gotham Broadcasting Corporation.  Also, the original Golden Age Spectre and his sidekick, Percival Popp, live in Gotham City as does Black Canary, Starman, and the Grey Ghost.

DC's 2011 reboot of All Star Western takes place in an Old West-styled Gotham. Jonah Hex and Amadeus Arkham are among this version of Gotham's inhabitants.

Apart from Gotham's superhero residents, the residents of the city feature in a back-up series in Detective Comics called Tales of Gotham City and in two limited series called Gotham Nights. Additionally, the Gotham City Police Department is the focus of the series Gotham Central, as well as the mini-series Gordon's Law, Bullock's Law, and Batman: GCPD.

Mayors
The first Gotham mayor depicted in comics was in Detective Comics #68 (October 1942). Theodore Cobblepot, great grandfather of the Penguin, was mayor in the late nineteenth century. An unnamed mayor ran afoul of the Court of Owls in 1914 and was killed by them. Archibald Brewster was mayor during the Great Depression. Mayor Thorndike was killed by the Made of Wood killer in 1948. Mayor Aubrey James was a contemporary of Thomas Wayne who was stabbed to death. Mayor Jessop was in office shortly after the Wayne murders. A man named Falcone was purportedly mayor during the earliest days of Batman's career. Shortly after, Mayor Wilson Klass directed the GCPD to turn a blind eye to Batman's activities after Batman saved his daughter. Mayor Hill was in office when the Joker debuted, and a man named Gill was mayor early in Batman's career, as was former police commissioner Grogan. An unnamed bald mayor was killed by a villain known as Midnight. Men named Carfax, Bradley Stokes, Sheppard, Taylor, and Hayes all served as mayor. Mayor Charles Chesterfield was killed by a sentient fat-eating blob of grease.

Hamilton Hill became mayor through the backing of crime boss Rupert Thorne but was ultimately ousted from office and replaced by George P. Skowcroft. An unnamed mayor is killed by Deacon Blackfire's followers and replaced by Donald Webster. Mayor Julius Lieberman is killed by a Predator. Mayor Goode served briefly<ref>Robin II #3. DC Comics.</ref> before being replaced by an African American man. Armand Krol became mayor and died of the Clench virus after leaving office. A woman, Marion Grange, became mayor with the backing of Bruce Wayne but was assassinated in Washington, D.C., while trying to secure federal aid for Gotham after an earthquake. In the wake of No Man's Land, Daniel Danforth Dickerson III served as mayor only to be killed by a sniper, after which he was replaced by David Hull. Seamus McGreevy served as mayor in the midst of a criminal conspiracy known as "The Body". An unnamed woman was mayor when Batman returned to Gotham a year after the Infinite Crisis. Sebastian Hady was a corrupt mayor who was eventually killed by the League of Shadows. Councilwoman Muir served as interim mayor when the city was in the grip of a virus that only affected men. Michael Akins, former commissioner of police, was appointed mayor, and later replaced by a man named Atkins. In the wake of Bane's takeover of the city, a man named Dunch served as mayor, and in the aftermath of the Joker War, anti-vigilante mayoral candidate Christopher Nakano wins election in a landslide.

In other media
Television
The 1960s live-action Batman television series never specified Gotham's location, though there are hints it actually represents New York City, including a city map and its location across the "West River" from "Guernsey City" in "New Guernsey". Fictional residents Mayor Linseed (portrayed by Byron Keith) and Governor Stonefellow are also direct allusions to real-life Mayor John Lindsay and Governor Nelson Rockefeller. The related theatrical movie showed Batman to be flying over suburban Los Angeles, the Hollywood Hills, palm trees, a harbor, a beach and a view of the Los Angeles City Hall.

The live-action TV series Gotham was filmed in New York City and was an important requirement of the show's creative team. According to executive producer Danny Cannon, its atmosphere was inspired by the look of the city itself in the 1970s films of Sidney Lumet and William Friedkin. Clues to this include and signs showing phone numbers bearing the area code 212. Donal Logue, who portrayed Harvey Bullock in the series Gotham, described different aspects of that series' design of Gotham City as exhibiting different sensibilities, explaining, "for me, you can step into things that almost feel like the roaring 20s, and then there's this other really kind of heavy Blade Runner vibe floating around. There are elements of it that are completely contemporary and there are pieces of it that are very old-fashioned...There were a couple of examples of modern technology, but maybe an antiquated version of it, that gave me a little bit of sense that it's certainly not the 50s and the 60s...But it's not high tech and it's not futuristic, by any means."

In the TV series Smallville, Gotham City is mentioned by the character Linda Lake in the episode "Hydro", who jokes she can see Gotham from her view. In "Reunion", one of Oliver Queen's friends mentions having to get back to Gotham.

The fifth episode of Young Justice, entitled "Schooled", indicates that Gotham is located in Connecticut, near Bridgeport.

The 2019 series Batwoman, which is set in Gotham City, was filmed in Chicago.

DC Animated Universe

Gotham City is featured heavily in Batman: The Animated Series. When describing Gotham City Paul Dini, a writer and director of the show, stated "In my mind, it was sort of like what if the 1939 World's Fair had gone on another 60 years or so".' In the episode "Joker's Favor", a driver's license lists a Gotham area resident's hometown as "Gotham Estates, NY". In the episode "Avatar", when Bruce Wayne leaves for England, a map shows Gotham City, at the joining of Long Island and the Hudson River. The episode "Fire from Olympus" shows a character's address in a police file indicating that Gotham City is located in New York state. The episode "The Mechanic", however, implies that Gotham resides in a state of the same name; a prison workshop is shown stamping license plates that read "Gotham: The Dark Deco State" (as a reference to the artistic style of the series). The episode "Harlequinade" states that Gotham City has a population of approximately 10 million people. This figure was also given in the 1960s Batman TV series episode "Egg Grows in Gotham", the thirteenth episode of the second season.

Arrowverse

Gotham City was first shown in the Arrowverse as part of "Elseworlds", a 2018 crossover storyline among the shows, which introduced Batwoman, although it had been referred to several times previously.

In The Flash episode "Marathon", a map shows Gotham City in place of Chicago, Illinois.

Theme parks
Themed lands meant to represent Gotham City have been physically constructed in several different theme parks around the world. WB Movie World in Germany featured a Gotham City section that housed Batman Adventure – The Ride, and Six Flags Magic Mountain opened a section called the "Gotham City Backlot" that featured Batman: The Ride. The section featured at Magic Mountain was designed by park designer Kevin Barbee, and alongside the opening of Batman: The Ride coincided with the largest expansion the park had ever undergone in 23 years, with the theming elements primarily having been inspired by the Batman films directed by Tim Burton. Both the ride and the Gotham City Backlot opened on March 26, 1994.

The Magic Mountain section closed at the end of the park's 2010 season and was later rethemed and rebranded as the "DC Universe," featuring characters and attractions outside of just Batman. It reopened in 2011.

Warner Bros. World Abu Dhabi features a section themed after Gotham City, including rides based on Batman, the Riddler and the Scarecrow as well as a walk-through attraction called "The Joker's Funhouse." The park and its Gotham City section were designed by Thinkwell Group. DC characters as they appear in both the attractions themselves as well as through live performers feature costumes based on The New 52 comic book relaunch from 2011. The Gotham City section neighbors another section themed after Metropolis, home of Superman.

Films
1989 Batman seriesBatman (1989) director Tim Burton wanted a timeless alternative to New York and described it as "hell burst through the pavement and grew". The look of Gotham was overseen by production designer Anton Furst, who won an Oscar for supervising the art department. Furst stated Batman was "definitely based in many ways on the worst aspects of New York City" and was inspired by Andreas Feininger's photographs of 1940s New York. Furst's draftsman Nigel Phelps created numerous charcoal drawings of the buildings and interior sets for the production.

Following the death of Furst, Burton tapped Bo Welch to oversee production design for Batman Returns (1992). Burton wanted Welch to re-imagine Gotham, stating "Batman didn't feel big to me – it didn't have the power an old American city has". Welch wanted to expand on the same basic concept for the sequel but moved away from European influences to show more American Art Deco/world's fair elements. When asked what inspired his interpretation of Gotham, Welch stated "[H]ow can I create a visual expression of corruption and greed? That got me thinking about the fascistic architecture employed at world's fairs... That feels corrupt because it's evocative of oppressive bureaucracies and dictatorships... So I looked at a lot of [Third Reich] art and images from world's fairs". To physically make the city seem darker, he designed tall "oppressively overbuilt" cityscape that physically blocked out light.

When Joel Schumacher took over directing the Batman film series from Tim Burton, Barbara Ling handled the production design for both of Schumacher's films, Batman Forever (1995) and 1997's Batman & Robin. Ling's vision of Gotham City was a luminous and outlandish evocation of modern Expressionism and Constructivism. Its futuristic design, which Washington Post critic Desson Howe felt evoked the 1982 film Blade Runner, were described by Ling in her book, Bigger, Bolder, Brighter: The Production Design of Batman & Robin as a cross between 1930s Manhattan and the "Neo-Tokyo" of Akira. Ling cited "neon-ridden Tokyo and the Machine Age as her influences, describing her Gotham as "like a World's Fair on ecstasy." When Batman is pursuing Two-Face in Batman Forever, the chase ends at Lady Gotham, the fictional equivalent of the Statue of Liberty. During Mr. Freeze's attempt to freeze Gotham in the film Batman & Robin, the targeting screen for his giant laser locates it somewhere on the New England shoreline, possibly as far north as Maine. The soundtrack for Batman & Robin features a song named after the city and sung by R. Kelly, later included on international editions of his 1998 double album R.The Dark Knight Trilogy

Director Christopher Nolan has stated that Chicago inspired his portrayal of Gotham, and the majority of both Batman Begins (2005) and The Dark Knight (2008) were filmed there. However, Christopher Nolan's Gotham City was deliberately set in New Jersey to honor Gotham's location in the comic books.

In Batman Begins, Nolan desired that Gotham appeared as a large, modern city that nonetheless reflected a variety of architecture styles and periods, as well as different socioeconomic strata. The production's approach depicted Gotham as an exaggeration of New York City, with elements taken from Chicago, the elevated freeways and monorails of Tokyo, and the "walled city of Kalhoon" in Hong Kong, which was the basis for the slum in the film known as The Narrows.

In The Dark Knight, more Chicago and New York influences were observed. On filming in Chicago, James McAllister, key location manager stated, "visually it's that look like you would see in the comic books." Nolan also stated "there's all these different boroughs, with rivers to interconnect. I think it's hard to get away from that, because Gotham is based on New York."

For The Dark Knight Rises (2012), the production utilized Pittsburgh, Los Angeles, New York City, Newark, New Jersey, London and Glasgow for shots of Gotham City.

DC Extended Universe

Within the DC Extended Universe, Gotham City is located in Gotham County, New Jersey. In Batman v Superman: Dawn of Justice, paperwork mentions that the city is in "Gotham County," and Amanda Waller's files on Deadshot and Harley Quinn in Suicide Squad reveal Gotham City to be located in the state of New Jersey. Zack Snyder confirmed that Metropolis and Gotham City are in close geographical proximity to each other. The Boston Globe compared the close proximity of Gotham City and Metropolis to Jersey City and Manhattan. A television ad for Turkish Airlines that premiered during the 2016 Super Bowl featured Bruce Wayne (played by Ben Affleck) promoting Gotham as a tourist destination.

To create Gotham in Batman v Superman: Dawn of Justice, the creative team "decided to recreate and combine large sections of existing selected city sections and adapt the architecture and layout to fit Gotham's. Thousands of photographs were put through MPC's photogrammetry pipeline to create geometry and textures for each city section."

In Birds of Prey, which takes place in Gotham, the entire shoot took place in Los Angeles. It was originally expected to be filmed in Atlanta and Savannah, Georgia, but the production received a tax credit from California, incentivizing the location change.

The Batman

The 2022 Matt Reeves film The Batman delves into the criminal underbelly of Gotham City through noir-style storytelling and highlights themes of corruption rampant within the city's government and police department. The movie used London, Glasgow, Liverpool, and Chicago as filming locations for Gotham City. Although filmed in various locations, Matt Reeves modeled Gotham on New York City. A towering skyscraper similar to the Empire State Building looms over Gotham City with an emblazoned sign that reads "Gotham Empire". A busy, commercial intersection called "Gotham Square" is seen in several shots and resembles Times Square with its bright signs and giant digital screens. The film's concluding sequence, while filmed at London's O2 Arena, is called "Gotham Square Garden", taking its naming convention from New York's Madison Square Garden. Various members of the Gotham City Police Department and the city's mobsters speak with East Coast accents similar to those of New York and New Jersey.

Joker (2019)Joker director and producer Todd Phillips imagined Gotham as a "version of Gotham was the pre-'80s boom New York, or urban northeastern center, but not the iconic New York." When asked how he re-imagined the city, production designer Mark Friedberg stated "our version of Gotham was what groomed him. It was both an appreciation for how severe things got in the city, but also for the world of possibility that lived in the version of that city."

Animated films

During the events of the direct-to-video film Batman & Mr. Freeze: SubZero (1998), a computer screen displaying Barbara Gordon's personal information refers to her location as "Gotham City, NY", and also displays her area code as being 212 – a Manhattan area code.Batman Beyond (1999–2001) envisions a Gotham City in 2039, referred to as "Neo-Gotham".

The 2008 direct-to-DVD film Batman: Gotham Knight shows Gotham as a large city with many skyscrapers and a bustling population.

Video games
Gotham City appears in several video games, including Batman Begins, DC Universe Online, and Mortal Kombat vs. DC Universe. The city makes another appearance in a video game with Injustice: Gods Among Us, where the player can fight outside or inside of Wayne Manor, on top of a building and in an alley. Other games that feature the city include Lego Dimensions and Rocksteady's Arkham franchise.

Gotham City appears as a location in the 2017 video game Fortnite Battle Royale as part of a crossover in commemoration of Batman's 80th anniversary. It is the fourth incarnation of the game's iconic Tilted Towers area. Players are able to use the Batglider after falling from a great height, as long as they remain in the confines of Gotham City. The location was removed on October 13, 2019, during the game's "The End" live event, in which it was sucked into a Black Hole along with the rest of the Fortnite Chapter 1 Island.

Batman: ArkhamBatman: Arkham Asylum (2009) opens with Batman driving Joker from Gotham City to Arkham Asylum. Joker also threatens to detonate bombs across Gotham. In Batman: Arkham City (2011), the slums of Old Gotham City (the northern island) were converted into Arkham City. Inside the prison walls, this part of Gotham contains various landmarks throughout the story, like Penguin's Iceberg Lounge, the Ace Chemical Plant, the Sionis Steel Mill, the Old Gotham City Police Department building, and the Monarch Theatre with the Wayne murder scene in Crime Alley. Most of these locations have major events in the story. In Batman: Arkham Origins (2013), an earlier, younger version of the city can be seen than that of other games in the Batman: Arkham series. In addition to the northern island, this installment in the series lets players explore a new southern island, connected to the former by the Pioneer's Bridge. The setting of Batman: Arkham Knight (2015), Central Gotham City, is five times larger than Old Gotham. In the novelization for Batman: Arkham Knight, it is revealed that Crime Alley was later renamed Wayne Way months after the 'death' of Batman.

References
General references
 Brady, Matthew and Williams, Dwight. Daily Planet Guide to Gotham City. Honesdale, Pennsylvania: West End Games under license from DC Comics, 2000.
 Brown, Eliot.  "Gotham City Skyline".  Secret Files & Origins Guide to the DC Universe 2000. New York: DC Comics, 2000.
 Grant, Alan. "The Last Arkham".  Batman: Shadow of the Bat #1.  New York: DC Comics, 1992.
 Loeb, Jeph.  Batman: The Long Halloween.  New York: DC Comics, 1997.
 Miller, Frank. Batman: Year One. New York: DC Comics, 1988.
 Morrison, Grant.  Arkham Asylum.  New York:  DC Comics, 1990.
 O'Neil, Dennis.  "Destroyer". Batman: Legends of the Dark Knight'' #27.  New York: DC Comics, 1992.

Inline citations

 
Fictional elements introduced in 1940
1940 in comics
DC Comics populated places
Fictional populated places in New Jersey
Fiction about crime
DC Comics islands